The 1860 Indiana gubernatorial election was held on October 1, 1860. Republican nominee Henry Smith Lane defeated Democratic nominee Thomas A. Hendricks with 51.89% of the vote.

General election

Candidates
Henry Smith Lane, Republican, former U.S. Representative
Thomas A. Hendricks, Democratic, former U.S. Representative

Results

References

1860
Indiana
Gubernatorial